
The Blaauwkrantz Bridge disaster occurred on 22 April 1911. Of the 55 passengers, 28 were killed and 22 seriously injured.

Some  before reaching the bridge a truck left the rails, near the centre of the bridge the truck, which was carrying stone to build the Grahamstown Cathedral, turned over and broke the necks of the buffers which detached it from the front of the train. The sudden impact of the rear coaches against the overturned truck caused them to topple over the side of the bridge and turn somersault before being dashed to pieces on the rocks below. A carriage roof, a door and a lampholder were detached in the fall and were found hanging on the side of the bridge.

The locomotive had made it to the other side of the bridge without damage, and so the engine driver raced the locomotive to Grahamstown to get help.

Fatalities
The following persons were killed in the disaster:
Mr. J Lewis-Smith, an attendant at Fort England Asylum
Mrs. J. Lewis-Smith and baby, wife of the above
Mrs. Smith’s son Willie, aged 3, succumbed to injuries three days later
Mrs. H.J. Moolman, widow of Dr. Moolman, Commadagga, daughter of Judge Hopley
Miss Mary Moolman, Commadagga
Mr. Adolphus H. Wright, law agent, Grahamstown. He was a cousin of the late Dr. Greathead and grandson of the late Mrs. Wright who built and endowed Christ Church. He leaves a widow and a numerous family.
Mr. James Forsyth, Grahamstown. Was confidential clerk to Rosenbaum Lax & Co and much respected son of Mr. William Forsyth. The deceased gentleman was at one time a schoolmaster at West Bank, East London, and went through the Langberg [sic] Campaign as a volunteer. He leaves a widow and three little daughters.
Mr. Clifford W. Dold was the well-known feather broker, Grahamstown
Mrs. Clifford Dold, Grahamstown and her three children, May, Cyril and Vincent
Mr. C.E. Dell of Kei Road
Mrs. Edward Dell of Kei Road.
Mr. J. Grant, Commercial traveler for Rolfes, Nebel & Co. Port Elizabeth
Mr. Arnold, Bathurst
Mrs. Cyril Bishop and her baby, Umtata
Miss Mildred Sherwood, daughter of an attendant at Fort England Asylum, Grahamstown
Miss Kathleen Hope Brereton, daughter of the Rev. A.W. Brereton, Registrar of Rhodes University College, Grahamstown.
Mr. David Hulley
Mr. Charlton Richardson
Mr. Paul Tarr, a well-known man, formerly proprietor of a boarding house in Market Square, Grahamstown
Mrs. Cooper
Miss Maggie Arnold
Mrs C.W. Dold’s nurse Mobald

References

Citations

Sources

External links
Heritage Portal: The Port Alfred to Grahamstown Railway 
The Port Alfred Kowie Railway 1883-1913
Blaauwkrantz Bridge at the artefacts.co.za website
Blaauwkrantz Bridge disaster at the vk.com website

Railway accidents in 1911
Eastern Cape
April 1911 events